Stelios Dimotsios (born 13 November 1974) is a Greek former sprinter who competed in the 2000 Summer Olympics, in the 2004 Summer Olympics, and in the 2008 Summer Olympics. He was born in Larissa.

He represented Greece at the European Athletics Championships in 1998 and 2002, the 2003 World Championships in Athletics and the 2001 IAAF World Indoor Championships.

Honours

References

1974 births
Living people
Greek male sprinters
Olympic athletes of Greece
Athletes (track and field) at the 2000 Summer Olympics
Athletes (track and field) at the 2004 Summer Olympics
Athletes (track and field) at the 2008 Summer Olympics
World Athletics Championships athletes for Greece
Athletes from Larissa
Mediterranean Games gold medalists for Greece
Mediterranean Games medalists in athletics
Athletes (track and field) at the 2001 Mediterranean Games
21st-century Greek people